Waves Radio is an Independent Local Radio station based in Peterhead, Scotland for Aberdeenshire with coverage across North East Scotland via DAB (Digital Radio) and on 101.2fm plus online via the website and smart speakers.

History 

Waves Radio was born in 1990 after its founder and owner known as Kenny King applied to the then Radio Authority for an RSL licence. The station in the early years was known as Waves AM  broadcasting by means of Restricted Service Licences from a studio at the Lido beach area in Peterhead, during the town's annual Scottish Week celebrations.

Following the success of the initial broadcasts the station returned every summer, with the introduction of additional broadcasts made over the Christmas periods in 1994 and 1995. The station ceased broadcasting in July 1996 and was unable to transmit over the festive period due to the announcement of the full-time licence. After gaining a full-time licence, Waves Radio launched on 6 December 1997, from its current studios at Blackhouse Circle.

In early Summer 2021, Kenny King announced his retirement with new owners in place by the end of that year with a new format and sound expected.

Programming

Local programming is produced and broadcast from Waves Radio's studios from 6am-10pm most days.

Waves Radio also airs syndicated programming including Totally 80s, Totally 90s and The World Chart.

The station's local presenters are Ralph McDonald, Glenn Moir, Duncan McKay, James G, Suzie D, Scott Wood, Alex Cameron, Kevin Murdoch and James Reid.

News and sport

Glenn Moir remains the station's news editor, responsible for producing the daily local news bulletins. These are broadcast at 8.30am, 12.30pm and 5.30pm Monday to Friday.

National bulletins from Sky News Radio are provided 24 hours a day.

The Sportsdesk, a daily round up of sports news, is broadcast at 5.10pm on weekdays. On Saturday afternoons scores and results are updated from 2-6pm on the Sportsmix.

Weather, traffic and showbiz bulletins are also broadcast.

External links
Waves Radio

Radio stations established in 1990
Radio stations in Peterhead